David Pavelka (born 18 May 1991) is a Czech footballer who plays as a midfielder for Czech club Sparta Prague and the Czech Republic national team.

Club career
In the final of the Czech Cup on 27 May 2015, Pavelka took the first penalty in the shoot-out and converted his spot-kick as his club Slovan Liberec defeated Jablonec 3–1.

On 19 January 2016, Pavelka moved abroad for the first time joining Kasımpaşa in the Turkish Süper Lig in a deal worth a reported $1.65m. He signed a contract until the end of the 2017–18 season.

On 6 October 2020, Pavelka returned to his native country, signing for Sparta Prague in the Czech First League.

International career
Pavelka was selected to represent the Czech Republic at the UEFA Euro 2016 tournament held in France.

He scored his first goal for the national side in a friendly against Brazil on 26 March 2019.

Career statistics

Club

International
.

International goals
Scores and results list Czech Republic's goal tally first, score column indicates score after each Pavelka goal.

Honours
Slovan Liberec
Czech Cup: 2014–15

References

External links
 Player's profile, FAČR (in Czech)
 

Living people
1991 births
Footballers from Prague
Association football midfielders
Czech footballers
Czech Republic under-21 international footballers
Czech Republic international footballers
Czech First League players
AC Sparta Prague players
1. FC Slovácko players
FC Slovan Liberec players
Kasımpaşa S.K. footballers
Süper Lig players
UEFA Euro 2016 players
Expatriate footballers in Turkey
Czech expatriate sportspeople in Turkey